Troy Fegidero is a Filipino footballer.

Fegidero was part of the Philippines national football team that participated at the 2000 AFF Championship.

In 2009, Fegidero was playing for Trimaxi-Agro FC of the North Football League. In a 2–0 upset against defending champions Ceres F.C., he was one of the two scorers.

He is the cousin of Norman, Dave, and Joshua Fegidero, all three of which were also part of the Philippine 2000 AFF Championship squad.

International goals
Scores and results list the Philippines' goal tally first.

References

External links
 

Philippines international footballers
Filipino footballers
Association football midfielders
1975 births
Living people